Battaristis prismatopa is a moth of the family Gelechiidae. It was described by Edward Meyrick in 1914. It is found in Guyana.

The wingspan is about 10 mm. The forewings are whitish ochreous, with a few scattered dark fuscous scales posteriorly. The plical and second discal stigmata are dark fuscous and there is a blackish-fuscous streak along the costa from before the middle to near the apex, cut by a very oblique white strigula beyond the middle. A fine white subterminal line is found from three-fourths of the costa to the tornus, rather acutely angulated in the middle, the upper half faintly curved outwards, followed by brownish suffusion, the lower straight. There is also a small black rhomboidal spot on the termen beneath the apex, edged with some whitish suffusion. The hindwings are dark grey.

References

Battaristis
Taxa named by Edward Meyrick
Moths described in 1914